Paagalpan is a 2001 Indian Hindi language action-romance film starring Karan Nath and Aarti Agarwal.

Synopsis

Aarti Agarwal and Karan Nath star as Roma Pinto and Sameer Malhotra. Roma Pinto, a beautiful young teenager, is the pride and joy of her five doting brothers, Arun, Jack, Sunny, Harry and Bunty.

Roma falls in love with the dashing and wealthy Sameer Malhotra, the heir to his father's millions. Although her brothers are initially opposed, she soon wins them over, only for matters to take a turn for the worse when one of Sameer's father's ships sinks, killing people from Roma's home town.

One of her brothers finds out about this, but is killed by the police and with Roma's family blaming Sameer for this death, the two young lovers are forced to elope.

Cast

Karan Nath - Sameer Malhotra
Aarti Agarwal - Roma Pinto
Vilas Ujawane - Arun Pinto
Bharat Dabholkar - Jack Pinto
Joy Fernandes - Sunny Pinto
Farhan Khan - Bunny Pinto
Harvey Rosemeyer - Harry Pinto
Talat Rekhi - Mr. Malhotra
Sambhavna Seth - Deepa Malhotra
Prema Kiran - Macchiwali
Premendra Sharma - Chief Accountant
Bakul Thakker - Inspector Vasant
Raj Nair - Inspector Wagh
Iqbal Dosani - Insurance Lawyer
Ramakrishna - Clerk
Darshan Jariwala - Malpani
Rajat Nath - Lawyer
Sunil kocharekar - Young Arun Pinto
Priyanka- Young Roma Pinto
Rahul Dhanani - Young Jack Pinto
Sparsh Agrawat - Young Sunny Pinto

Soundtrack 
The Music for the film is composed by Raju Singh. The album consists on 8 songs.

Track listing 
"Kahin Na Kahin Hai" - Alka Yagnik, Kumar Sanu
"Dil Hai Deewana" - Alka Yagnik, Udit Narayan
"Mera Dil" - Srinivas, K. S. Chithra
"Dekhte Dekhte" - Srinivas, K.S.Chithra
"Paagalpan" - Raymond George
"A Ding Dang Do - Sunidhi Chauhan, Udit Narayan
"Jhoote The Vaade" - Alka Yagnik, Kumar Sanu
"Loota - Swastik

References

External links 
 

2000s Hindi-language films
2001 films
2001 romantic drama films
Indian romantic drama films
Indian romantic action films
Films shot in Goa
Indian interfaith romance films
Films about feuds